In organic chemistry, Nef synthesis is the addition of sodium acetylides to aldehydes and ketones to yield acetylenic carbinols. It is named for John Ulric Nef, who discovered the reaction in 1899.

This process is often erroneously referred to as the Nef reaction, which is an unrelated chemical transformation discovered by the same chemist.

See also
Alkynation

References

Carbon-carbon bond forming reactions
Organometallic chemistry
Addition reactions